Jesse St. John Geller (born October 5, 1989) is an American songwriter and singer (also stylized as jesse saint john). St. John has written for a number of artists, most notably Britney Spears, Kim Petras, Dorian Electra, Charli XCX, Brooke Candy, and The Neighbourhood, among others. He released his debut EP, Don't Stop Dancing. Life Gets Sad, in May 2019. Saint John co-wrote the Billboard number-one single, "Truth Hurts", by Lizzo.

Early life
St. John grew up in Orange County, California, and attended a conservatory art school there.

Career
Jesse Saint John began his career in songwriting writing for Brooke Candy, a personal friend. After a while, he started doing sessions with producers and other writers and ended up turning it into a career. He has also worked with artists such as Britney Spears, Camila Cabello, Lauv, the band The Neighbourhood, Charli XCX and Aquaria.

In February 2018, he released his first single, "Move", followed by a second single in May 2018 titled, "Fake It". He also signed on to perform at the LA Pride event in June 2018. There he performed both tracks as well as debuting a new song called "Last Dance" that is expected to drop later in the year.

In 2019, a song Saint John wrote with Lizzo in 2017 titled "Truth Hurts" gained popularity, eventually topping the Billboard Hot 100.
According to Billboard, "Truth Hurts" is officially the longest-running Billboard Hot 100 No. 1 by a solo female rapper.

In 2020, he wrote an English version of the song "Voice" (목소리; Moksori) by Loona, called "Star". It was released as a music video through YouTube on November 17, 2020.

Discography

Extended plays

Singles

Appearances

Songwriting credits

Awards and nominations

|-
! scope="row" |2020
|"Truth Hurts" (as a songwriter)
|Grammy Award for Song of the Year
|

References

External links

Living people
American male pop singers
Songwriters from California
American LGBT singers
American LGBT songwriters
Musicians from Orange County, California
Singers from Los Angeles
1989 births
21st-century American male singers
American male songwriters